Wildlife Lane is a street and apparent neighborhood in Hernando County, Florida. It is located along the north side of US 98-SR 50 east of Hill 'n Dale, Florida and west of Interstate 75 in Florida.

Demographics 
As of the census of 2000, there were 254 people, 220 households, and 245 families residing in the area. The population density was 34.2/km2 . There were 259 housing units.  The racial makeup of the area was 98.2% White, .50% African American, 1.2% Native American, .1% Asian

There were 220 households, out of which 33.7% had children under the age of 18 living with them, 39.9% were married couples living together, 14.0% had a female householder with no husband present, and 43.1% were non-families. 38.0% of all households were made up of individuals, and 21.2% had someone living alone who was 65 years of age or older. The average household size was 2.14 and the average family size was 2.82.

In the area the population was spread out, with 22.1% under the age of 18, 7.8% from 18 to 24, 21.7% from 25 to 44, 18.7% from 45 to 64, and 29.7% who were 65 years of age or older. The median age was 44 years.

The median income for a household in the area was $33,489, and the median income for a family was $31,060. Males had a median income of $29,837 versus $21,804 for females. The per capita income for the area was $16,265. About 16.8% of families and 21.5% of the population were below the poverty line, including 27.9% of those under age 18 and 11.5% of those age 65 or over.

References 

Geography of Hernando County, Florida
Neighborhoods in Florida
Roads in Hernando County, Florida